Shea Brandon Seals (born August 26, 1975) is an American former professional basketball player. He played in four games during the 1997–98 NBA season as a shooting guard for the Los Angeles Lakers of the National Basketball Association (NBA).

Seals, who played collegiately for the Tulsa Golden Hurricane men's basketball team and is still their all-time career scoring leader, also played in the ABA with the Indiana Legends and the Kansas City Knights, in the NBDL with the Mobile Revelers, and professionally in France with Villeurbanne and Chalon-sur-Saône.  The Tulsa Golden Hurricane have retired Seals' number (#21). He served eight years as the head basketball coach at Booker T. Washington High School in Tulsa, Oklahoma.

He is probably best remembered for his performance against Dream Team III on July 6, 1996, the first exhibition game prior to the 1996 Summer Olympics in Atlanta, Dream Team III won the Gold. He scored 20 points, leading all players on both squads, for his Collegiate All-Star team. Despite his amazing game which helped the College Stars build a 17-point lead at the half, Dream Team III managed to win 96–90.

References

External links
NBA.com player profile
NBA D-League profile
NBA stats @ basketballreference.com
France - Pro A profile 

1975 births
Living people
All-American college men's basketball players
American expatriate basketball people in France
American expatriate basketball people in the Philippines
American men's basketball coaches
American men's basketball players
Basketball coaches from Oklahoma
Basketball players from Oklahoma
High school basketball coaches in the United States
Los Angeles Lakers players
Mobile Revelers players
Philippine Basketball Association imports
San Miguel Beermen players
Shooting guards
Sportspeople from Tulsa, Oklahoma
Tulsa Golden Hurricane men's basketball coaches
Tulsa Golden Hurricane men's basketball players
Undrafted National Basketball Association players